Jukka Piironen (11 August 1925 – 5 March 1976) was a Finnish pole vaulter who competed in the 1952 Summer Olympics. Piironen was born in Leppävirta and died in Helsinki, aged 50.

References

1925 births
1976 deaths
People from Leppävirta
Finnish male pole vaulters
Olympic athletes of Finland
Athletes (track and field) at the 1952 Summer Olympics
Sportspeople from North Savo